USS S-15 (SS-120) was a second-group (S-3 or "Government") S-class submarine of the United States Navy.  Her keel was laid down on 13 December 1917 by the Lake Torpedo Boat Company in Bridgeport, Connecticut. She was launched on 8 March 1920 sponsored by Mrs. Simon Lake, and commissioned on 15 January 1921.

Pre-war service
Attached to SubDiv 18, S-15 departed New London, Connecticut, on 31 May 1921, and sailed via the Panama Canal, California, Hawaii, and Guam to the Philippines. She arrived at Cavite, Luzon, on 1 December. In 1922, she sailed from Cavite on 11 October, visited Hong Kong from 14 October to 28 October, and returned to Cavite on 1 November. Sailing from Manila on 15 May 1923, S-15 visited Shanghai, Chefoo, and Chinwangtao before returning via Woosung and Amoy to Cavite on 11 September. In the summer of 1924, she again visited China and returned to Olongapo on 23 September.

Departing Cavite on 29 October, she arrived at Mare Island Naval Shipyard, California, on 30 December. Remaining at Mare Island in 1925 and 1926, she operated along the west coast through 1927. From February 1928 into 1935, S-15 served in the Panama Canal area, although she visited Baltimore, Maryland, from 15 May to 5 June 1933. She departed Coco Solo on 11 January 1935 for Philadelphia, Pennsylvania, where she decommissioned on 26 April 1935.

World War II 
S-15 was recommissioned on 3 January 1941 at Philadelphia.  Following voyages to Bermuda, she operated at Saint Thomas, United States Virgin Islands, from 31 October to 9 December 1941; in the Panama Canal area from January 1942 into December 1943; at Guantanamo Bay through May 1944; in the Panama Canal area from June through September; at Trinidad for the rest of the year; and at Guantanamo from January into March 1945.

S-15 departed Guantanamo on 23 March 1945 and reported at New London for inactivation. She was decommissioned on 11 June 1946 at Philadelphia and was struck from the Naval Vessel Register. On 4 December 1946 she was sold for scrapping to the Potomac Shipwrecking Company of Maryland.

Trivia
Following the decommissioning of S-23 in November 1945, S-15 was the last S Class submarine in commission.   Following the decommissioning of O-4 in September 1945, S-15 was the oldest submarine in commission in the U.S. Navy.

S-15 was one of the only five submarines (along with her sisters S-14, S-16, S-17 and S-48) built by the Lake Torpedo Boat Company to see service in World War II.  She was last submarine built by the Lake Torpedo Boat Company in service when she was decommissioned in June 1946.

Awards
American Defense Service Medal
American Campaign Medal
World War II Victory Medal

References 

Ships built in Bridgeport, Connecticut
S-15
World War II submarines of the United States
1920 ships